Nqobizitha Mangaliso Ndlovu (born 16 November 1980) is a Zimbabwean parliamentarian and minister. He is affiliated with ZANU–PF and represents the constituency of Bulilima East.
He was appointed the Minister of Industry, Commerce and Enterprise Development after the 2018 election. In November 2019, he was appointed Zimbabwe's Minister of Environment, Climate Change, Tourism and International Trade, replacing Prisca Mupfumira.

References 

1980 births
Living people
Members of the National Assembly of Zimbabwe
ZANU–PF politicians
Government ministers of Zimbabwe
Industry ministers
Trade ministers